Kévin Bru (born 12 December 1988) is a professional footballer who plays as a midfielder for C'Chartres. Born in France, he represented France at youth international level before playing for Mauritius national football team.

Club career

Rennes
Born in Paris, Bru initially played for the youth teams of US Paris 11th and Paris FC before training at the INF Clairefontaine academy (France national Football team Centre). He then moved to Rennes, like his brother Jonathan Bru in 2003. Bru started out at the reserve side and helped them win the reserve league. Bru later revealed that Premier League side Tottenham Hotspur offered him a contract, but rejected the move, opting to stay in France instead.

Bru made his Stade Rennais debut on 6 January 2007, where he came on as a substitute for Sylvain Marveaux in the second–half, in a 3–1 loss against Romorantin in the first round of Coupe de France. Several weeks later on 19 January 2007, he signed his first professional contract with the club, signing a three–year contract. Five days later, On 24 January 2007, he made his league debut for the club, coming on as a late substitute, in a 2–0 win over Monaco. Bru made another appearance for the side in the league, also coming on as a late substitute, in a 2–0 loss against Sedan on 24 February 2007. At the end of the 2006–07 season, Bru went on to make three appearances in all competitions for Rennes.

Ahead of the 2007–08 season, Bru were among four youngsters to watch by Stade Rennais Online. He also signed a contract extension, keeping him until 2011. However, he spent the first half of the season on the substitute bench in number of matches before being loaned out in January. Nevertheless, Bru did make an appearance for the side on 31 October 2007, where he started and played 64 minutes before substituted, in a 2–0 loss against Valenciennes in the round of 16 of Coupe de la Ligue.

Ahead of the 2009–10 season, Bru was expected to be loaned out again, having been dropped from the first team training in the pre–season. However, he remained out of the first team and appeared once as an unused substitute, in a 2–1 win over Sochaux in the fourth round of Coupe de la Ligue. This led to him to leave the club to pursue first team football.

Loan spells
On 4 January 2008, Bru was loaned out to Châteauroux for the rest of the 2007–08 season. He made his Châteauroux debut, starting the whole game and played 77 minutes before being substituted, in a 2–1 loss against Nantes on 11 January 2008. Shortly after, his performance earned him January's Player of the Month by Châteauroux's supporters. Bru went on to make 10 appearances for Châteauroux.

Bru was loaned out again to Clermont for the rest of the 2008–09 season, along with teammate Lhadji Badiane. He made his debut for the club, where he came on as a substitute for Guillaume Loriot in the 23rd minute, in a 1–0 loss against Vannes in the opening game of the season. In his second appearance for Clermont, on 8 August 2008, Bru set up a goal for Badiane, who scored an equaliser, in a 2–2 draw against Brest. Since joining the club, Bru became a first team regular at Clermont, where he played in the midfield position. He then scored two goals between 9 January 2009 and 16 January 2009 against Bastia and Brest. Despite missing out several matches at Clermont, Bru went on to make 26 appearances and scoring once in all competitions.

Dijon
On 7 January 2010, it was announced that Dijon had signed Bru from Rennes until June 2011.

Bru made his Dijon debut on 19 January 2010, coming on as a substitute, just 25 minutes from the game, in a 1–2 draw against Caen. He scored his first Dijon goal on 29 January 2010, in a 2–1 loss against Nîmes. His second goal then came on 12 February 2010, in a 4–3 win over Bastia. Despite missing out several matches towards the end of the 2009–10 season, Bru went on to make 14 appearances for the side.

In the 2010–11 season, Bru continued to feature in the first team despite being behind in the pecking order at the start of the season. After making 11 appearances for the side, his contract with Dijon was terminated early.

Boulogne
Bru signed with fellow Ligue 2 team Boulogne on a two-year contract on 1 February 2011. Bru made his US Boulogne debut, where he came on as a substitute for Mustapha Yatabaré, in a 1–0 win over Istres on 12 February 2011. At the end of the 2010–11 season, Bru went on to make nine appearances for the club.

Ahead of the 2011–12 season, Bru missed the first four months with the side, due to an injury. It wasn't until on 5 November 2011 when he made his first appearance of the season, where he started and played for 61 minutes before being substituted, in a 1–0 loss against Metz. He then played a vital role on 3 December 2011 against Le Havre when he set up a goal for Hugo Cianci to score an equaliser, in a 1–1 draw. After being sidelined with an injury that kept him out for a month, Bru made his return from injury as a substitute, in a 2–0 loss against Lens on 6 March 2012. Bru scored his first goal for the club on 16 March 2012, in a 3–3 draw against Nantes. Then, on 4 May 2012, Bru then scored his second goal of the season, in a 3–0 win over Laval. However, the club struggled throughout the 2011–12 season and was relegated from Ligue 2. At the end of the 2011–12 season, finishing the season, making 20 appearances and scoring 2 times in all competitions, Bru was linked a move away from the club, with Novara Calcio and ChievoVerona after he wanted to leave the club.

Istres
Despite visiting the infrastructures of the Bulgarian club Levski Sofia in the summer 2012, Bru decided to stay in France by joining Ligue 2 side Istres, thus giving up on hopes of playing in the Europa League in the following season.

Bru made Istres debut in the opening game of the season, where he started the whole game and set up a goal for Nassim Akrour to score an equaliser, in a 1–1 draw against FC Nantes. In a follow–up match against Gazélec Ajaccio on 2 August 2012, Bru scored his first Istres goal, in a 2–0 win. Bru later scored his second goal of the season and set up one of the goals, in a 4–1 win over Tours on 26 October 2012. Although he became a first team regular at Istres, Bru, however, was soon plagued by injuries. This also combined with suspension when Bru missed the last game of the season after picking up six yellow cards in the league this season. At the end of the 2012–13 season, Bru went on to make 33 appearances and scoring 2 times in all competitions.

Levski Sofia
After the end of the 2011–12 season, Bru signed a three-year contract with First Professional Football League side PFC Levski Sofia on 10 June 2013. The move reported to have cost 250,000 euros. Prior to this, Bru was on the verge of joining Levski Sofia but rejected the move, citing family reason.

Bru made his Levski Sofia debut in the opening game of the season, where he started the match before coming off as a substitute in the 87th minute, in a 2–1 loss against Botev Plovdiv. Since making his debut, Bru quickly established himself in the starting eleven for the side, playing in the midfield position under Manager Slaviša Jokanović. Following the departure of Jokanović, Bru then suffered an injury in late–October. He then made his return from injury on 8 November 2013, where he came on as a late substitute, in a 1–0 loss against Beroe Stara Zagora. In a follow–up match against Litex Lovech on 23 November 2013, Bru scored his first goal for the club, in a 4–1 win.

However, Bru suffered another injury on two occasions that kept him out for two months. It wasn't until on 22 February 2014 when he made his return from injury and set up a goal for Dimitar Makriev, in a 2–2 draw against Slavia Sofia. Since returning from injury, Bru was featured four more times for the side before struggling to regain his first team place. After the club blocked his international call–up with Mauritius; Bru threatened to take his case to FIFA, leading the club to reverse their decision and allowing him to join the national team squad. Upon returning to the first team, Bru was removed from the first team by the club, which was welcomed by the club's supporters. Despite this, Bru went on to make a total of 26 appearances and scoring once in his first season at Levski Sofia.

It was announced on 27 May 2014 that Bru left the club by mutual consent despite having two years contract left. After his departure from the club, Bru reflected his time at Levski Sofia and adapting in Bulgaria.

Ipswich Town
On 31 July 2014, Ipswich Town manager Mick McCarthy confirmed that Bru had signed for the club following a successful trial.

Bru made his Ipswich Town debut, where he came on as a late substitute, in a 2–1 win over Fulham in the opening game of the season. Four days later, he made his first start for the side, in the first round of the League Cup, in a 1–0 loss against Crawley Town after the game went extra time. At the start of the 2014–15 season, Bru "quickly got to grips with the EFL Championship slightly quicker" and soon established himself in the first team. Bru also became the club's fan favourite and was chant of "shouting Bru rather than boo!" For his performance in the first team, he signed a contract with the club, keeping him until 2018. In addition, Bru was named the club's Player of the Month for January. He scored his first goal for the club in a 4–2 victory against Birmingham City on 24 February 2015. Bru spoke out his settlement since joining Ipswich Town. Bru later helped the club reach the play-offs but was unsuccessful after losing to local rival Norwich City 4–2 on aggregate. Despite being sidelined on four occasions during the 2014–15 season, Bru finished his first season at Ipswich Town, making 36 appearances and scoring once in all competitions.

In the 2015–16 season, Bru started well in the opening game of the season when he scored in a 2–2 draw against Brentford. However, Bru was sidelined after suffering a hamstring injury in training and was sidelined for a month. After returning to the substitute bench since late–September, he did not make return to the first team until on 20 October 2015 when he started the whole game, in a 3–0 loss against Hull City. Since returning from injury, Bru regained his first team place until another injury occurred in late–November. After returning to the first team from injury in mid–December, Bru regained his first team place shortly after. It wasn't until on 8 March 2016 when he scored a "sensational first-half strike", in a 2–2 draw against Bolton Wanderers. For this, he was named the club's Goal of the Year. At the end of the 2015–16 season, Bru went on to make 29 appearances and scoring 2 times in all competitions.

In the 2016–17 season, Bru started the season, appearing in the first team for the number of matches. He continued to play in the midfield position despite facing competitions and his own consistent performance. As a result, Bru found himself behind the pecking order and appeared on the substitute bench. Despite this, Bru scored his first goal of the season on 30 December 2016, in a 2–1 win over Bristol City. However, his form and place soon dropped, which resulted in him having less playing time. Despite being sidelined during the 2016–17 season, Bru went on to make 28 appearances and scoring once in all competitions.

Ahead of the 2017–18 season, Bru was placed on a transfer list and told that he can leave the club. At one point, Bru was involved in a transfer move, which involved Rotherham United's Danny Ward, but the move never happened and Ward went to Cardiff City. He also revealed that his potential move to Toulouse fell through at the last minute. Although the move never happened, Bru was not given a shirt number by the club. Bru found himself behind the pecking order for the side at the start of the season. With his first team limited and failed to find a club, Bru trained with the first team to keep himself fit. However, he was called into the first team around October and made his first appearance of the season on 28 October 2017, coming on as a substitute, in a 2–1 win over Burton Albion. After the match, Bru appeared in the first team for the number of matches. His return appearance in number of side resulted in him being praised by Manager Mick McCarthy. After suffering from a rib injury in December 2017, Bru then made his 100th appearance for the side, in a 1–0 loss against Wolverhampton Wanderers on 23 December 2017. Although he remained on a transfer list, Bru stayed at the club for the rest of the season, due to injury crisis in the midfield section and ultimately being pushed to leave the club in January. As months goes by towards the end of the season, he made a few appearances for the side. At the end of the 2017–18 season, Bru went on to make 10 appearances in all competitions.

It was announced that Bru left the club in April 2018. By the time of his departure, Bru made 103 appearances and scoring 4 times during his time at Ipswich Town.

Apollon Limassol
On 14 June 2018, Bru signed for Cypriot First Division club Apollon Limassol.

Dinamo București
On 27 June 2019, he signed a contract with Romanian club Dinamo București. He was released four months later, after nine games for Dinamo, eight in Liga I and one in Cupa României.

Return to France
After nine months without a club, Bru returned to France with Créteil in October 2020. He made his debut in a Coupe de France fifth round game, and scored a goal in his first Championnat National game against Boulogne on 23 October 2020.

On 17 January 2022, Bru signed for Championnat National 2 side Versailles. He was part of the club's squad that reached the Coupe de France semi-finals.

On 21 June 2022, Bru signed with C'Chartres, also in Championnat National 2.

International career
Bru has made several appearances for the French U-19 team, but has never represented France with the senior team. Bru previously made several appearances for the French U-18 team.

Due to his Mauritian descent (his parents are from the Indian Ocean island), the opportunity arose for him to represent Mauritius internationally, which he took in 2011. He earned his first cap for Mauritius on 5 June 2011, in their AFCON qualifying match against DR Congo. Three years later, Bru was called up to the national team again and played his first match on 20 April 2014, in a 2–0 loss against Mauritania. Three years later, on 28 March 2017, Bru captained Mauritius for the first time in his career and set up a goal for Walter Duprey St. Martin, in a 1–1 draw against Comoros. Since then, he had captained the national side throughout the year. The following year, on 22 March 2018, he scored his first goal for Mauritius, in a 1–0 win over Macau.

Personal life
Bru's parents are from Mauritius. His brother Jonathan is also a former footballer and also represented Mauritius internationally with the Mauritius national football team. Growing up in Paris, France, Bru reflected on his childhood, saying: "It was a hard, tough area where I grew up and I have got friends who have been in prison and are still in prison, Who knows what would have happened to me if I didn't make it as a footballer? Maybe I would have got dragged down that road that some of my friends have gone, I don't know. From the age of six though, I always wanted to play football and my brother and I would play every minute that we had that was free."

In addition to speaking French, Bru is currently learning Bulgarian and English as a result of moving to Levski Sofia and Ipswich Town respectively. Bru's agent is Antoine Sibierski, who helped him recommend a move to Ipswich Town.

In February 2015, Bru's dog Grizzler went missing in Claydon, which was found eventually after Bru made an appeal on his Twitter account. In June 2017, Bru was convicted of a series of motoring offences, resulting in him being banned from driving for 12 months.

Career statistics

Club

International

Scores and results list Mauritius goal tally first, score column indicates score after each Bru goal.

Honours
Versailles

 Championnat National 2: 2021–22

Individual
Ipswich Town Goal of the Season: 2015–16

References

External links
Profile at LevskiSofia.info 

Living people
1988 births
Association football midfielders
French people of Mauritian descent
French footballers
Mauritian footballers
Mauritius international footballers
Mauritian expatriate footballers
Footballers from Paris
France youth international footballers
INF Clairefontaine players
Stade Rennais F.C. players
LB Châteauroux players
Clermont Foot players
Dijon FCO players
US Boulogne players
FC Istres players
PFC Levski Sofia players
Ipswich Town F.C. players
Apollon Limassol FC players
FC Dinamo București players
US Créteil-Lusitanos players
FC Versailles 78 players
C'Chartres Football players
English Football League players
Ligue 1 players
Ligue 2 players
Cypriot First Division players
Liga I players
Championnat National players
Expatriate footballers in Bulgaria
Expatriate footballers in England
Expatriate footballers in Cyprus
Expatriate footballers in Romania
French expatriate sportspeople in Bulgaria
French expatriate sportspeople in England
French expatriate sportspeople in Cyprus
French expatriate sportspeople in Romania